Ungli is a 2014 Indian vigilante crime thriller film directed by Rensil D'Silva and produced by Hiroo Yash Johar and Karan Johar under Dharma Productions. The film stars Emraan Hashmi, Randeep Hooda, Kangana Ranaut, Neha Dhupia, Angad Bedi, Neil Bhoopalam and Sanjay Dutt. Mahesh Manjrekar, who collaborated with Dharma Productions for the first time, appears in a negative role. The film was released on 28 November 2014.

Plot 
4 friends Kalim (Angad Bedi), Gautam (Neil Bhoopalam), Maya (Kangana Ranaut) and Abhay (Randeep Hooda) delve into what seems to be their "first case" , having started the Ungli gang, which fights against corruption. Their job is to bug corrupt people and teach them moral lessons quite unconventionally. They target a corrupt minister and become the most wanted people in Mumbai, but also earn respect, affection, and admiration in the media and general public.

Meanwhile, ACP Ashok Kaale (Sanjay Dutt) meets his superior, DCP Shivraman (Shiv Kumar Subramaniam) who introduces him to Police Commissioner Arvind Kaul (Raza Murad) with the task of deciphering the Ungli gang. Later, Kaale travels to another police station where he meets an amusingly frustrated officer, Kaale's colleague and bomb-squad commandant Mishra (Shishir Sharma), who is disgusted with the "crime" his recruit Nikhil Abhyankar (Emraan Hashmi) has done. Eventually, it goes so: a college was attended to by the bomb squad when there was news that a bomb was planted there. Nikhil took advantage of the situation and met his girlfriend (Rachel White) with whom he shared a kiss, but soon they were caught by the dogs of the Bomb Squad. Later, it surfaced up that the call was made from Mishra's desk, and Nikhil did it. Kaale finds it funny at first and points out the clever act Nikhil made, but when the officer reprimands Nikhil and himself, Kaale visits Nikhil's mother (Reema Lagoo) where she tells him that Nikhil had the qualities of his father, Kaale's colleague Arvind, and that Nikhil was raised by Kaale like his own son. Nikhil, it is shown, attends a disco bar, where Kaale calls him up to discuss matters concerning the "Ungli" gang.

Nikhil begins searching for altruistic opportunities to earn the Ungli gang great fame, once by blowing up the roads in front of a minister's house and accusing politicians and PWD workers of torturing the people by lavishly spending money on renovation of roads directly linked to houses and offices of politicians and corporates alone, another instance by putting up a label of dishonesty on the auto-rickshaw drivers by accusing them of charging high rates and showing reluctance when asked to drive to places close by. Finding him adamant, Maya suggests that Nikhil too has wishes to join the gang, and on certain terms and conditions, the four friends admit Nikhil, and narrate the story behind the gang's formation.

Maya's brother Rajeev Singh aka Ricky (Arunoday Singh) was a great fitness freak and struck a rapport with the four friends quite a time. However, one day, while trying to prevent a scuffle between an old man (Avijit Dutt) and a bratty youngster Anshuman, Ricky tried to defend the old man, but Anshuman struck him hard, landing him straight into coma. The old man later decided to complain to the police, but was advised against it by the police itself, when a hunchback of Police Supremo B.R. Dayal (Mahesh Manjrekar), Anshuman's father, spoke so. The old man was firm, but when his granddaughter, while waiting at a bus stop, was threatened with an acid attack, the old man was forced to swerve from his stand to protect her. This plunged Maya into grief, but Abhay was angry at one of Maya's comments and this paved the way for the "Ungli" gang. Nikhil poses as a law student to illusion the four.

While preparing for a raid, Nikhil sprained his knee, but later called up Kaale when the four left. However, feeling remorseful, he later attacked Kaale to defend his new "friends", but when his identity was discovered, the four friends slammed him with Abhay hitting him hard, and Kaale further hitting him, but Nikhil later chides Kaale for believing the "Ungli" gang as a criminal force. However, when faced with a loss of duty, finding that DCP Shivraman is trying to bribe him into getting a posting of choice to save ends, Kaale agrees with Nikhil, and seeks out the gang to expose Dayal. Meanwhile, Abhay confesses to his co-worker, Tiesta Sen (Neha Dhupia) his love for her as well as his identity of the "Ungli" gang.

Exposing a dirty racquet of money makers in the widely distributed Mumbai police force with a simple chemical trick involving sulphur sprayed over printed notes that would leave a lasting black impressions on the officer's tongue via saliva, Kaale regains duty and is promoted to the post of Commissioner, getting Dayal and Anshuman arrested. Later, Kaale reassures the gang that the city won't need another as long as everything is under control.

Cast 
 Emraan Hashmi as Nikhil Abhyankar
 Randeep Hooda as Abhay Kashyap
 Kangana Ranaut as Maya Singh
 Neha Dhupia as Teesta
 Angad Bedi as Kalim
 Neil Bhoopalam as Gautam a.k.a. Goti
 Sanjay Dutt as ACP Ashok "Kaali" Kale
 Arunoday Singh as Rajeev "Ricky" Singh, Maya's brother
 Rajat Kaul as Anshuman
 Raza Murad as Commissioner Arvind Kaul
 Sunil Shinde as Chief Minister
 Mahesh Manjrekar as gangster B.R. Dayal
 Shiv Kumar Subramaniam as DCP Shivraman
 Reema Lagoo as Nikhil's mother
 Elli Avram as Anika
 Rachel White as Nikhil's girlfriend
 Charanpreet Singh as friend
 Shraddha Kapoor as Basanti (Special appearance in song "Dance Basanti")

Reception 
Mid-day gave the film 3 stars out of 5, highlighting the direction and performances, and said the film would have been "wonderful" except for the dialogues, which it said were sometimes "downright idiotic".

Soundtrack

The music of Ungli has been composed by Salim–Sulaiman, Sachin–Jigar, Gulraj Singh, Aslam Keyi. The soundtrack comprises five tracks. The song "Dance Basanti" was the first single track starring Hashmi and Kapoor, released on 28 October 2014. The song is sung by Vishal Dadlani and Anushka Manchanda, composed by Sachin–Jigar with lyrics written by Amitabh Bhattacharya. "Pakeezah", the second single track picturised on Hashmi and Ranaut, released on 3 November 2014. The song is sung and composed by Gulraj Singh, a former music assistant to Shankar–Ehsaan–Loy, with the lyrics of Manoj Yadav. "Ungli Pe Nachalein", the title track picturised on Hashmi, released on 11 November 2014, sung by Dev Negi and Shipra Goyal, written by Kumaar and composed by Aslam Keyi, who previously scored music for War Chhod Na Yaar.

Track listing

Awards and nominations

References

External links 
 
 

2014 films
2010s Hindi-language films
2010s vigilante films
2010s buddy comedy films
2010s crime comedy-drama films
2010s crime drama films
2010s crime comedy films
Indian buddy comedy films
Indian crime comedy-drama films
Indian vigilante films
2014 comedy films
2014 drama films